Priuralsky District (Nenets: Пэ”хэвыхы район, Pəꜧhəvyhy rajon) is an administrative and municipal district (raion), one of the seven in Yamalo-Nenets Autonomous Okrug of Tyumen Oblast, Russia. It is located in the west of the autonomous okrug. Its administrative center is the rural locality (a selo) of Aksarka. Population: 14,995 (2010 Census);  The population of Aksarka accounts for 20.9% of the district's total population.

References

Notes

Sources

Districts of Yamalo-Nenets Autonomous Okrug